U.S. Army Materiel Command (AMC) is the primary provider of materiel to the United States Army. The Command's mission includes the management of installations, as well as maintenance and parts distribution.
It was established on 8 May 1962 and was activated on 1 August of that year as a major field command of the U.S. Army. Lieutenant General Frank S. Besson, Jr., who directed the implementation of the Department of Army study that recommended creation of a "materiel development and logistics command", served as its first commander.

AMC operates depots; arsenals; ammunition plants; and other facilities, and maintains the Army's prepositioned stocks, both on land and afloat.

The command is also the Department of Defense Executive Agent for the chemical weapons stockpile and for conventional ammunition.

AMC is responsible within the United States Department of Defense for the business of selling Army equipment and services to allies of the United States and negotiates and implements agreements for co-production of U.S. weapons systems by foreign nations.

Locations 

AMC is currently headquartered at Redstone Arsenal in Huntsville, Alabama, and has operations in approximately 149 locations worldwide including more than 49 American States and 50 countries. AMC employs  upwards of 70,000 military and civilian employees. AMC was located at Fort Belvoir, Virginia between 2003 and 2005 before being relocated to Alabama by the 2005 Base Realignment and Closure Commission. From 1973 to 2003, AMC was headquartered in a building at 5001 Eisenhower Avenue in Alexandria, Virginia, and prior to 1973, it was headquartered at what is now Reagan National Airport. Between January 1976 and August 1984, AMC was officially designated the United States Army Materiel Development and Readiness Command (commonly referred to as DARCOM).

Commanders

Major subordinate commands
 United States Army Contracting Command
 United States Army Sustainment Command
 United States Army Aviation and Missile Command
 United States Army Communications-Electronics Command,
 United States Army Chemical Materials Activity
 Joint Munitions Command
 United States Army Tank-automotive and Armaments Command
 United States Army Security Assistance Command
 United States Army Medical Logistics Command
 United States Army Financial Management Command, formerly a direct reporting unit of the Department of the Army, is now subordinate to AMC, effective 1 Oct. 2019
 United States Army Installation Management Command, formerly a direct reporting unit of the Department of the Army, will now be part of AMC
 Military Surface Deployment and Distribution Command
See also: United States Army Medical Materiel Agency (an LCMC)

Formerly subordinate commands
 CCDC (formerly United States Army Research, Development and Engineering Command) completed its transfer to United States Army Futures Command on 3 February 2019, which operates research and development engineering centers; Army Research Laboratories supports the centers' activities.

Other commands
Program Executive Office, Assembled Chemical Weapons Alternatives

See also
Comparable organizations
U.S. Armed Forces systems commands
 Marine Corps Systems Command
 United States Navy systems commands
 Naval Sea Systems Command
 Naval Air Systems Command
 Naval Information Warfare Systems Command
 Naval Facilities Engineering Systems Command
 Naval Supply Systems Command
 Air Force Materiel Command
 Space Systems Command

Notes

References

External links

 
1962 establishments in Virginia
Military units and formations established in 1962